Steffen Patzold (born 1 September 1972) is a German historian. Patzold is Professor of Medieval History at the University of Tübingen and specializes in the political and religious history of the Carolingian Empire.

Biography
Steffen Patzold was born in Hanover, Germany on 1 September 1972. Patzold studied history, art history and journalism at the University of Hamburg from 1991 to 1996, gaining his MA in history under the supervision of Hans-Werner Goetz. He gained his PhD in 1999. From 2000 to 2006, Patzold was the assistant of Goetz. He completed his habilitation at the University of Hamburg in 2006. Since 2007, Patzold has been Professor of Medieval History at the University of Tübingen.

Patzold specializes in the study of political and religious history of the Carolingian Empire. He is a Member of the Heidelberg Academy of Sciences and Humanities and co-editor of Germanische Altertumskunde Online.

Selected works
 Konflikte im Kloster, 2000
 Episcopus, 2008
 Das Lehnswesen, 2012
 Ich und Karl der Große. Das Leben des Höflings Einhard, 2013
 Gefälschtes Recht aus dem Frühmittelalter, 2015
 Presbyter. Moral, Mobilität und die Kirchenorganisation im Karolingerreich,, 2020

Sources
 </ref>

1972 births
German non-fiction writers
German medievalists
Germanic studies scholars
Living people
People from Hanover
University of Hamburg alumni
Academic staff of the University of Tübingen